is a railway station in Kita-ku, Hamamatsu,  Shizuoka Prefecture, Japan, operated by the third sector Tenryū Hamanako Railroad.

Lines
Tsuzuki Station is served by the Tenryū Hamanako Line, and is located 53.3 kilometers from the starting point of the line at Kakegawa Station.

Station layout
The station has a single side platform and a single-story station building which also serves as the local bakery.

Adjacent stations

|-
!colspan=5|Tenryū Hamanako Railroad

Station history
Tsuzuki Station was established on April 1, 1938 as a station of the Japan National Railways Futamata Line with the completion of the Kanasashi-Mikkabi extension. Freight services were discontinued from 1962, and small parcel services from 1970, after which time the station was no longer staffed. After the privatization of JNR on March 15, 1987, the station came under the control of the Tenryū Hamanako Line.

Passenger statistics
In fiscal 2016, the station was used by an average of 39 passengers daily (boarding passengers only).

Surrounding area
Lake Hamana
Tōmei Expressway

See also
 List of Railway Stations in Japan

External links

  Tenryū Hamanako Railroad Station information 
 

Railway stations in Shizuoka Prefecture
Railway stations in Japan opened in 1938
Stations of Tenryū Hamanako Railroad
Railway stations in Hamamatsu